Malygin is a rural locality (a passing loop) in Dyatkovsky District, Bryansk Oblast, Russia. The population was 1 as of 2010. There is 1 street (Vokzalnaya).

Geography 
Malygin is located 8 km south of Dyatkovo (the district's administrative centre) by road. Latyshovka is the nearest rural locality.

References 

Rural localities in Dyatkovsky District